Goychay may refer to:
 Goychay Rayon, Azerbaijan
 Goychay (city), Azerbaijan